The 2015 Latrobe City Traralgon ATP Challenger was a professional tennis tournament played on outdoor hard court. It was the fourth edition of the tournament which was part of the 2015 ATP Challenger Tour. It took place in Traralgon, Australia between 26 October – 1 November 2015.

Singles main draw entrants

Seeds

 Rankings are as of 19 October 2015.

Other entrants
The following players received wildcards into the singles main draw:
  Jacob Grills
  Blake Mott
  Bradley Mousley
  Thomas Fancutt

The following players received entry into the singles main draw with a protected ranking:
  Greg Jones

The following players received entry from the qualifying draw:
  Marinko Matosevic
  Sebastian Fanselow
  Dayne Kelly
  Robin Stanek

The following players received entry as a lucky loser:
  Oliver Anderson

Champions

Singles

  Matthew Ebden def.  Jordan Thompson 7–5, 6–3

Doubles

  Dayne Kelly /   Marinko Matosevic def.  Omar Jasika /  Bradley Mousley 7–5, 6–2

References

External links
 
 
 ATP official site

Latrobe City Traralgon ATP Challenger
2015 in Australian tennis
Tennis in Victoria (Australia)